The 1994–95 season was the 64th season for Real Madrid in La Liga.

Summary
During the summer, the club was reinforced in the midfield with Danish playmaker Michael Laudrup (in a controversial transfer from Barcelona) and Argentine Fernando Redondo; right back defender Sánchez Flores arrived from Valencia, and changes came to the dugout too, with Argentine head coach Jorge Valdano arriving from CD Tenerife after seven years of his forced retirement as a player during the climax of "La Quinta del Buitre" era.

The team played a 4–4–2 system with Buyo remaining as goalkeeper, Quique Sánchez Flores replacing aging Chendo as right back, while the central defenders were Fernando Hierro and Manolo Sanchís who replaced an injured Alkorta, along with the left back Mikel Lasa. Valdano changed the midfield towards aggressive play with Redondo and Laudrup in the center, Amavisca played superb as left winger and Luis Enrique took the right wing, a new role for him that turned out to be crucial for the squad. In the attacking line, Zamorano recovered his high level of play after a disastrous campaign last season, winning the Pichichi Trophy as the league top scorer. The season also saw the breakthrough of a 17-year-old forward Raúl who would assume the starting position in place of rapidly declining Alfonso and Emilio Butragueño.

In the meantime, financial worries increased during the season and on 16 February 1995, incumbent Ramon Mendoza defeated challenger Florentino Pérez in the club's longest ever Presidential election by just 698 votes. Mendoza's re-election was possible due to the good pace of the team in the league. Madrid ultimately clinched its first 26th league title and first in five years. In the cup competitions, however, the team was less fortunate, going out at the round of 16 stage both in the Copa del Rey and UEFA Cup to Valencia and Odense, respectively. The latter exit was particularly marred due to an embarrassing 0–2 home loss after a 3–2 first leg away victory.

Squad

Reference:

Transfers
Reference:

In

 from FC Barcelona
 from Celta Vigo
 from CD Tenerife
 from Real Valladolid
 from Real Madrid Castilla
 from Real Madrid Castilla
 from Valencia CF

Out

 to Real Betis
 to Celta Vigo
 to SD Compostela
 to Real Oviedo
 to Deportivo La Coruña
 from Celta Vigo
 from Sporting Gijón

Competitions

La Liga

Position by round

League table

Matches

Copa del Rey

Round of 16

UEFA Cup

First round

Second round

Round of 16

Statistics

Squad statistics

References

External links
 BDFutbol

Real Madrid CF seasons
Real Madrid
Spanish football championship-winning seasons